The 1974 Oakland Raiders season was the team's 15th season in Oakland and fifth in the National Football League. The team would post a superb 12–2 record; the campaign's two losses would be by a total of four points. The Raiders' record (the team's best since 1969) would ensure their fourth AFC West title in five years.

For the second straight campaign, the Raiders exacted revenge upon the team that had eliminated them in the prior year's playoffs. This time, Oakland toppled the two-time defending Super Bowl champion Miami Dolphins, by a score of 28–26, in the playoffs' Divisional round. Quarterback Kenny Stabler threw a last-minute winning touchdown pass to running back Clarence Davis in what has come to be known as the "Sea of Hands" game.

For the second straight season, however, the Raiders lost in the AFC Championship Game. They were upset, 24–13, by the eventual champion Pittsburgh Steelers. While the Raiders led 10–3 at the end of the third quarter, a defensive meltdown would allow the Steelers to score 21 points in the final frame.

The 2006 edition of Pro Football Prospectus listed the 1974 Raiders as one of their "Heartbreak Seasons", in which teams "dominated the entire regular season only to falter in the playoffs, unable to close the deal." Pro Football Prospectus states, The John Madden Raiders were a consistently good regular season team, but the playoffs were a different story. The 1972 season came to an end with the painful Immaculate Reception game. The 1973 Raiders ended Miami's 18-game winning streak during the regular season but lost to the Dolphins in the AFC Championship game. In 1974, the Raiders seemed to finally have all the pieces."

Despite the disappointment at the end of the 1974 season, Pro Football Prospectus continues, "[t]he Raiders persevered, keeping the team's core together the next several seasons. In 1975, they again fell to the Steelers in the AFC title game, but caught a break in the 1976 AFC Championship, when they cruised to a 24–7 victory over Pittsburgh, who were without running backs Franco Harris and Rocky Bleier. Finally, in the Super Bowl, they did not waste their opportunity, crushing the Vikings 32–14 behind Ken Stabler and Clarence Davis."

"The Autumn Wind", a poem written by former NFL Films President and co-founder Steve Sabol, became the unofficial team anthem of the Raiders, and was first used for the team's official team yearbook film in 1974. It was narrated by John Facenda, and dubbed "The Battle Hymn of the Raider Nation".

1974 marked the end of an era, as the last remaining original Raider, longtime offensive lineman Jim Otto, retired after all 10 seasons in the AFL, 5 seasons in the NFL, and 15 seasons with the Raiders. Counting playoff games, he showed up for every one of the first 223 games in Oakland Raiders history.

Offseason

Draft

Roster

Regular season

Schedule

Game summaries

Week 1

Week 2

Week 3

Week 14

Standings

Playoffs

Game summaries

Divisional: vs. Miami Dolphins

 Source: Pro-Football-Reference.com

References

Sources
 Raiders on Pro Football Reference
 Raiders on Database Football

Oakland
Oakland Raiders seasons
AFC West championship seasons
Oakland